Štefan Zošák (born 3 April 1984) is a former Slovak professional football midfielder who had most recently played for Poprad.

Club career

Early career
Zošák was born in Prešov. He started his career at FK Hanušovce nad Topľou, Bukóza Vranov nad Topľou and was later transferred to 1. FC Košice where he spent three seasons. He was signed by Ružomberok in the summer of 2002 at the age of 18. In the 2005–06 season he won the title with MFK Ružomberok in Corgoň Liga and the Slovak Cup. He also captained the team. In June 2010, he joined Slovak club Žilina. He played 22 matches in his first season. He qualified with Žilina for the 2010–11 UEFA Champions League and played two group games. In the next season he made four appearances for Žilina. In January 2012 Zošák joined Slovak club Tatran Prešov on a six-month loan. He made his debut for 1. FC Tatran Prešov against Košice on 3 March 2012. He then continued his career with Nitra before returning to Ružomberok in summer 2013.

International career
Zošák participated at the 2003 FIFA World Youth Championship for Slovakia and played a match against Brazil in the round of 16.

Honours

Ružomberok
Corgoň Liga (1): 2005–06
Slovak Cup (1): 2005–06

International
UEFA European Under-19 Football Championship: 3rd place (2002)

References

External links
MŠK Žilina profile 

1984 births
Living people
Slovak footballers
Slovakia under-21 international footballers
Slovakia youth international footballers
Association football wingers
FC VSS Košice players
MFK Ružomberok players
MŠK Žilina players
1. FC Tatran Prešov players
FC Nitra players
FK Poprad players
FC Shakhter Karagandy players
Slovak Super Liga players
Kazakhstan Premier League players
Slovak expatriate footballers
Expatriate footballers in Kazakhstan
Sportspeople from Prešov
2. Liga (Slovakia) players